Robert Huntington Adams (1792–July 2, 1830) was an American lawyer and politician from the state of Mississippi. He was briefly a member of the United States Senate, suddenly dying six months after his election to that body.

Biography

Early years

Robert Huntington Adams was born in Rockbridge County, Virginia in 1792; as was common in the 18th century, the day and month went unrecorded. He learned the trade of barrelmaking there and worked several years at that task.

By 1806, Adams had attained sufficient learning to graduate from Washington College (now Washington and Lee University) at Lexington, Virginia. He subsequently studied law, was admitted to the bar, and started a legal practice in Knoxville, Tennessee. Then following a brief residence in Nashville, he relocated to Natchez, Mississippi where he rose to prominence as an attorney and politician.

Adams was reckoned by U.S. Senator Henry S. Foote to be an able orator despite an inferior formal education, able to expound upon a great variety of subjects in such a compelling manner that his listeners felt themselves in the presence of "one of nature's most wonderful productions."

Political career

Adams was elected to the Mississippi House of Representatives in 1828, representing a district including the city of Natchez there.

In the 19th century, state legislatures elected U.S. Senators, sometimes creating unusual paths for advancement. This was particularly true in the case of Robert Adams, who barely one year after being elected a state representative was surprisingly tapped to fill the seat vacated the recently deceased Thomas B. Reed, narrowly winning election to the open seat by vote of the legislature in a four-man field.

Adams, a Jacksonian, advanced to the office and was sworn in on January 6, 1830. He served in Washington, D.C. throughout the winter and spring, returning to Mississippi for summer recess in May of that year.

Death and legacy

Not long after his return to Natchez, Adams was stricken ill and died suddenly on July 2, 1830, at the age of just 38. His body was interred in Natchez City Cemetery.

Adams was remembered by Henry Foote as a talented and able public speaker for whom "there is no knowing what amount of fame he might have acquired, or what wonders he would have achieved upon the theatre of national affairs" had he not suffered a premature death.

See also
List of United States Congress members who died in office (1790–1899)

Footnotes

External links

1792 births
1830 deaths
People from Rockbridge County, Virginia
People from Knoxville, Tennessee
Politicians from Natchez, Mississippi
Washington and Lee University alumni
Tennessee lawyers
Members of the Mississippi House of Representatives
Date of birth unknown
Mississippi Jacksonians
Democratic-Republican Party United States senators from Mississippi